Mirny Urban Settlement is the name of several municipal formations in Russia.

Mirny Urban Settlement, a municipal formation which the town under republic jurisdiction of Mirny in Mirninsky District of the Sakha Republic is incorporated as
Mirny Urban Settlement, a municipal formation which the urban-type settlement of Mirny in Krasnoyarsky District of Samara Oblast is incorporated as

See also
Mirny (disambiguation)
Mirninskoye Urban Settlement

References

Notes

Sources
Registry of the Administrative-Territorial Divisions of the Sakha Republic.

